Lenika De Simone (born 29 August 1988) was a Spanish female artistic gymnast, representing her nation at international competitions.

She participated at the 2008 Summer Olympics in Beijing, China, and the 2007 World Artistic Gymnastics Championships.

References

External links
Lenika De Simone at Sports Reference
http://www.intlgymnast.com/index.php?option=com_content&view=article&catid=56:Spain&id=505
https://www.youtube.com/watch?v=7d9bLq6M4ww

1988 births
Living people
Spanish female artistic gymnasts
Sportspeople from Hollywood, Florida
Olympic gymnasts of Spain
Gymnasts at the 2008 Summer Olympics
Mediterranean Games bronze medalists for Spain
Competitors at the 2005 Mediterranean Games
Mediterranean Games medalists in gymnastics
21st-century Spanish women